Brachynotus sexdentatus is a species of crab in the family Varunidae. It is native to the Mediterranean Sea and Black Sea, and became established for a time in Swansea Docks (United Kingdom).

Description
The front of the carapace has two lobes and three lateral teeth on each side, each ending in a sharp point. The whole animal is olive green, with speckling in black, with the legs slightly paler or greyer. The claws are of similar side on either side of the body, but are much larger in males than in females.

Ecology and life cycle
They are produced between February and October. After hatching, the larvae of B. sexdentatus pass through five zoeal stages (instars that use appendages of the thorax for movement).

Distribution
Brachynotus sexdentatus is native to the Mediterranean Sea, from Spain to Israel, and the Black Sea coasts of Romania and Turkey. It is also found in the Suez Canal, having entered the canal's northern end before 1927, and was discovered in 1957 in the Queen's Dock, Swansea, presumably having been transported by shipping from the Mediterranean Sea. This site was artificially warmed by the adjacent Tir John coal-fired power station, which used sea-water as its coolant, drawing it in from the King's Dock, and expelling it into the Queen's Dock. In 1976, the power station closed, ending the transport of waste heat into the Queen's Dock, and the population of B. sexdentatus died out soon after.

Taxonomy

Brachynotus sexdentatus was first described by Antoine Risso in 1827, as a species in the genus Goneplax. Wilhem de Haan described the new genus Brachynotus in 1833, and B. sexdentatus was eventually designated its type species. Brachynotus gemmellari has in the past been treated as a subspecies of B. sexdentatus, and the population from Swansea Docks was originally identified as "B. sexdentatus gemmellari". It is now treated as a full species, although the Swansea population may represent B. sexdentatus (sensu stricto). Although later opinions place the Swansea specimens in B. gemmellari rather than B. sexdentatus, they also showed that the two species are indistinguishable from DNA sequences at the 16S ribosomal DNA locus, and may either be very recently separated or may be experiencing high levels of gene flow.

References

Grapsoidea
Crustaceans of the Atlantic Ocean
Fauna of the Mediterranean Sea
Crustaceans described in 1827